Srđan Savičević (born 14 June 1971) is a former Serbian football player.

References

1971 births
Living people
Serbian footballers
FK Sloga Kraljevo players
Apollon Pontou FC players
Tampereen Pallo-Veikot players
Serbian expatriate footballers
Expatriate footballers in Greece
Expatriate footballers in Finland
FC Elista players
Expatriate footballers in Russia
Russian Premier League players
Veikkausliiga players
Association football forwards